Timbro is a liberal think tank and publishing company located in Stockholm, Sweden. In 2013, the foundation received a renewed financial commitment from the Confederation of Swedish Enterprise to ensure its long-term existence.

Timbro has economically liberal and free market leanings; its mission is to promote every individual's right to self-empowerment, and the ideas that individual freedom precedes economic equality, and that political power over individuals and businesses should be minimized.

History

Originally, Timbro was founded by business man Ernfrid Browaldh (1889–1982), later CEO of Svenska Handelsbanken, as a publishing company. It derives its name from his two children, Tore and Ing-Marie Browaldh. Later, Browaldh donated Timbro to the Foundation of Swedish Business.

In the 1970s Timbro was transformed into a think tank. Swedish politics was dominated by an increasingly left-leaning political climate, and within the Swedish Employers’ Association was a growing concern that a number of reforms under way threatened a free market economy. Sture Eskilsson, at the time working for Swedish Employers’ Association's information and communication department, noted that the intellectual momentum belonged to the left which also dominated public discourse. In a PM from 1971 to the directors of the Swedish Employers’ Association, Eskilsson outlined an action plan to promote the values and ideas supporting a free market economy. Eskilsson argued that the Swedish Employers’ Association should allocate resources to influence the prevalent ideas, and described a way to maximize the results of such an effort. He especially pointed to the intellectual elite as a target group. Eskilsson wrote: “[the dominance of present-day leftish ideas] would hardly have been possible without the efforts made by Young Philosophers”. The Swedish Employers’ Association followed Eskilsson's recommendations and increased its budget for its opinion-making branch.

The Swedish Employers’ Association effort to influence the public discourse didn't go unnoticed and was widely reported in the media. Social Democratic daily Arbetet wrote about a “secret document” put together by the Swedish Employers’ Association: “[...] this is how the leftish tendency should be stopped.” A fierce debate ensued on how big business wanted to change the intellectual climate in Sweden. In the left-leaning journal FIB/Kulturfront, author Jan Guillou and journalist Peter Bratt wrote an article head-lined, “The secret document  of the board of Swedish Employers’ Association” about the alleged efforts by “buyer's of labor to shape our opinions”, and that the document, “ ... outlines the experiences to date for influencing how opinions are formed in Sweden, as well as giving guidelines for the near future.”   

Eskilsson's PM is today viewed as a major turning point for the public discourse in Sweden even though its effects during the 1970s were rather modest.

In 1978, Eskilsson's plan led to the creation of Timbro as a think tank. It more or less assumed the opinion-making branch of the Swedish Employers’ Association. The purpose was to create a platform for an independent intellectual discussion to flourish. Participants and events should no longer be directly connected to the Swedish Employers’ Association. In conjunction with this, Eskilsson also persuaded the Foundation of Swedish Business to finance Timbro to increase its independence and further distance the new think tank from the Swedish Employers’ Association.

The initiative caused strong antipathy and suspicion among the Left. Social Democratic newspapers published a number of articles with personal attacks directed at Sture Eskilsson. Even in the parliament emotions ran high, and the chairman of the Communist Party demanded of Social Democratic minister Ingvar Carlsson, later Prime Minister, to “do something” about Sture Eskilsson.

The main focus of Timbro was to in different ways influence the politic language. It was done through the publishing of books, educational efforts for the younger generation of opinionmakers, and presenting reports in different central areas, including labor policy, the European Union, integration of immigrants, taxes, welfare, and general ideological issues.

In 1983, Timbro participated in arranging a demonstration in Stockholm to protest against the Social Democrats’ efforts to make into law that revenues of private companies should be shared with labor unions. The demonstration gathered 75,000 participants on the 4th of October, a date that since has become a symbol for free market proponents in Sweden.

Activities 
However, the demonstration in 1983 was a unique event, as demonstrations have not been a focus for Timbro. Instead, developing and spreading ideas directed towards media and pundits have remained the main strategy. During the 1980s, book publishing became increasingly important, even extended into fiction. Operation Garbo, a literary effort to influence security policy, was a great success leading to media coverage that was instrumental to ideological debates.

During the 1980s Timbro was the owner of private City University, which developed programs in economics. Among its students was Anders Borg, later finance minister, who in the 1990s published two reports while studying at the City University.

Timbro also regularly publishes classic Swedish and international scholarly work. In later years it has also published books by major center-to-right thinkers as Fredrik Segerfeldt, Mattias Svensson, Johan Lundberg, Lena Andersson, Erik Hörstadius, and Katrine Marcal. In addition to Swedish writers Timbro publishes international books on current events by, for instance, Deirdre McCloskey, Friedrich Hayek, Milton and Rose Friedman, and Ayn Rand.

Timbro has established several educational programs. Sture Academy, named after Sture Eskilsson, is a one-year program. Since 2003 it has offered courses in ideology and politics.

The Reform Academy is a program where students delve into practical, economic issues as well research relevant for policy issues dominating the current economic-political debate.

The Digital Academy is aimed at young persons belonging to classical liberal and center-to-right factions, and has its focus on digital communication.

In addition, Timbro provides a hands-on six week summer program where students can try their hand at actual research and the writing of reports in different areas.

People

People currently working at Timbro 
 Andreas Johansson Heinö, Publisher.
 Jacob Lundberg, Director of the Program on Economics.
 Caspian Rehbinder, Director of the Program on Labor Policy.
 Emanuel Örtengren, Director of the Program on European Policy.

Chief executive officers 
Chief executive officers of Timbro have been:
 Sture Eskilsson, (1978–1981)
 Mats Svegfors, (1981–1982)
 Kjell-Erik Sellin (1983–1988)
 Mats Johansson, (1988–1995)
 Odd Eiken, (1995)
 P.J. Anders Linder, (1996–2000)
 Mattias Bengtsson, (2000–2004)
 Cecilia Stegö Chilò, (2005–2006)
 Maria Rankka, (2006–2010)
 Markus Uvell, (2010–2014)
 Karin Svanborg-Sjövall, (2014–2020)
 Benjamin Dousa, (2020– )

Several former Timbro employees are today active in business, politics or as participants in the public debate, among these are Johan Norberg, Johnny Munkhammar, Eva Cooper, Thomas Idergard, Fredrik Segerfeldt, Mattias Svensson. Other notable former Timbro employees are Gunnar Hökmark, today Member of the European parliament, and Ulf Kristersson, the current chairman of the Moderate Party and Prime Minister of Sweden.

See also
 Civita – an Oslo, Norway-based think tank
 Classical liberalism
 Laissez-faire
 Non-governmental organizations in Sweden
 Stockholm Free World Forum

References

External links
 Official website 
 Official website in English 

Think tanks established in 1978
Liberalism in Sweden
Political and economic think tanks based in the European Union
Book publishing companies of Sweden
Think tanks based in Sweden
1978 establishments in Sweden
Mass media in Stockholm
Companies based in Stockholm